Bachai is a town and union council of Swabi District in Khyber-Pakhtunkhwa.

References

Populated places in Swabi District
Union Councils of Swabi District